Viliami Molofaha (died 1970) was a Tongan politician who served as a member of the Legislative Assembly.

Biography
Molofaha worked for the Tongan police for several years. A resident of Neiafu, he represented Vavaʻu in the Agricultural Council, and was elected to the Legislative Assembly as one of the two MLAs from Vavaʻu.

Molofaha was married to Aulola. The couple adopted Aulola's nephew Malakai ‘Ake, who later became Tonga's Chief Medical Officer. He died in 1970.

References

Year of birth missing
1970 deaths
20th-century Tongan people
Members of the Legislative Assembly of Tonga
People from Vavaʻu
Tongan police officers